Clifford Scot Pastornicky (born November 18, 1958) is an American former Major League Baseball player.

Pastornicky was drafted by the Kansas City Royals in the 8th round of the 1980 draft. He made his debut on June 14, 1983 with the Royals, and batted 2/5/.125 in ten career games in the majors.  He played the majority of his career in Double and Triple-A.

Prior to playing professionally, Pastornicky was an All-WAC shortstop at BYU from 1978 - 1980 setting the career home run record with 31 HRs.

Personal
His son is shortstop Tyler Pastornicky. His father, Ernest Pastornicky, played in the Chicago Cubs minor league system.

References

External links

1958 births
Living people
BYU Cougars baseball players
Charleston Royals players
Glens Falls White Sox players
Gulf Coast Royals players
Kansas City Royals players
Kansas City Royals scouts
Maine Guides players
Major League Baseball third basemen
Memphis Chicks players
Omaha Royals players
Baseball players from Seattle
Waterbury Indians players
Seattle Mariners scouts
Toronto Blue Jays scouts
Mat-Su Miners players